The city of Sonoma, California has established about 90 sites to represent the significant historic sites and structures.

Separate from the city's list, state and federal government agencies have identified landmarks in the city.  Some sites overlap the city's list and others are separate.

List of Sonoma Historic Landmarks

See also
 List of National Historic Landmarks in California
 California Historical Landmarks in Sonoma County, California
 List of Landmarks in unincorporated Sonoma County

References 

 
National Historic Landmark
Historic Landmark
History of Sonoma County, California